Vim is the name of a range of household cleaning products originally produced by Lever Brothers (later Unilever). The Vim brand is currently owned by the German multinational company Henkel, and the British multinational company Unilever in Canada, and Vietnam.

History
Vim scouring powder, one of the first products created by William Lever, first appeared on the market in 1904, an offshoot of Monkey Brand scouring soap. The name is thought to derive from the colloquial English word "vim" which has the same meaning as the Latin vis, vim ("force", "vigour").

Vim was produced at Port Sunlight near Liverpool, England. The name Vim remained solely associated with the scouring powder until 1993, when a range of associated products were released. Vim was also the name of a detergent tablet manufactured by Lever Brothers, and sold in the United States during the 1960s. It was the sponsor of the sitcom on CBS, The Lucy Show, starring Lucille Ball .

Former owner Unilever abandoned Vim in favour of rival product Jif, although it was still sold in some other countries in Europe.

In December 2004, it was sold to the group Guaber, based in Italy. Vim is currently owned by Henkel Group after its acquisition of Spotless Group in 2015, although it is still marketed by Unilever in Canada and Sri Lanka, where it has a 90% market share. Vim is also sold as a Unilever brand in South Africa and India.

See also
 Ajax, for many years the main competitor to Vim in the market in the United Kingdom

Notes 

Cleaning products
Unilever brands